Wamaq Azra is a 1946 Bollywood film.

References

1946 films
1940s Hindi-language films
Indian black-and-white films